Lawrence Hall may refer to:

People 

Larry Hall (North Carolina politician), American politician
 Lawrence Hall (Oregon politician), member of the Oregon Territorial Legislature, 1851
 Lawrence Hall (tennis), American tennis player
 Lawrence Kendall Hall (1940–1997), known as Larry Hall, American singer
 Lawrence M. Hall (1908–1973), Minnesota Democratic politician
 Lawrence Sargent Hall (1915–1993), American author
 Lawrence W. Hall (1819–1863), U.S. Representative from Ohio

Places 
Lawrence Hall of Science, a public science center above the University of California, Berkeley
Lawrence Hall, London, a Grade II listed building
Lawrence Hall, Oxford, a historic hall
David Lawrence Hall, an academic building at the University of Pittsburgh in Pittsburgh, Pennsylvania
Lawrence Hall, a 1929 high-rise  building at Point Park University, in downtown Pittsburgh, Pennsylvania
Lawrence Hall, a historic hall at St. Cloud State University
Lawrence Hall (University of Oregon), home of the University of Oregon School of Architecture and Allied Arts
Lawrance Hall, (so spelled), a hall on the Old Campus of Yale University
Lawrence Hall, a hall on the main quad of Colgate University

See also
St. Lawrence Hall, a meeting hall in Toronto, Canada

Hall, Lawrence
Architectural disambiguation pages